The 2021 Women's Pan-American Volleyball Cup was an exceptional edition of the annual women's volleyball tournament. It was held in Santo Domingo, Dominican Republic from September 11–20, 2021.

Dominican Republic won the gold medal (5th overall) after defeating the Mexico in the final by 3–0.

Venues
Pabellón de Voleibol, Santo Domingo, Dominican Republic

Participating nations
A maximum of six (6) teams are qualified by the FIVB/NORCECA ranking, plus
the points earned as results of the past 2019 XVIII Norceca Senior Women Pan- American Cup to participate in the 2021 Norceca XIX Senior Women Pan American Cup, Final Six.

Dominican Republic qualified as the host nation, and the remaining 5 qualifying teams are the top 5 in the NORCECA continental ranking as of January 1, 2021.

No South American teams participated as this tournament coincided with the South American women's championships.

Round robin

Final rounds

Semifinals

3rd place match

Final

Statistics leaders
Statistics leaders of the tournament:

Final standing

Individual awards

The following players received individual recognition following the conclusion of the tournament:

Most Valuable Player
  Prisilla Rivera
Best Setter
  Brie King
Best Outside Hitters
  Prisilla Rivera
  Veronica Jones-Perry
Best Middle Blockers
  Jineiry Martínez
  Alison Bastianelli
Best Opposite
  María Fernanda Rodríguez
Best Scorer
  María Fernanda Rodríguez
Best Server
  Gaila González
Best Libero
  Brenda Castillo
Best Digger
  Brenda Castillo
Best Receiver
  Brenda Castillo

References

Women's Pan-American Volleyball Cup
Pan-American Volleyball Cup
Pan-American Volleyball Cup
Volleyball in the Dominican Republic
International volleyball competitions hosted by the Dominican Republic